Lampang, also called Nakhon Lampang to differentiate from Lampang province, is the third largest city in northern Thailand and capital of Lampang province and the Mueang Lampang district. Traditional names for Lampang include Wiang Lakon and Khelang Nakhon. The city is a trading and transportation center.

Geography

Lampang city is in the valley of the Wang River, bordered by the Khun Tan Range on the west and the Phi Pan Nam Range on the east. The river, a major tributary of the Chao Phraya, flows through the city. The city lies mainly on the south side of Wang River, although the old parts of the city had been originally developed in the north side of it. Nowadays, downtown Lampang has grown in the southeast of the river along Bunyawat and Pahon Yothin Roads.

Climate

Lampang has a relatively dry climate relative to nearby provinces.  "Winter" starts after the last rains, typically November, and lasts until March. Cold air masses from Siberia sometimes lead to nighttime temperatures below , although that is quite rare. Winter is characterized by dry, sunny, and quite pleasant days, and cool and occasionally foggy nights. In recent times, the blue winter sky is often marred by the practice of burning the fields after the harvest, as well as the smog generated by Mae Mo coal-fired power plants.

Summer typically runs from March until June. Late afternoon thunderstorms and hailstorms are frequent.

Rainy season runs from June until November, and significant rain may occur in May as well. Being in a relative rain shadow, Lampang receives less precipitation than neighboring provinces and rarely suffers from the flooding which has plagued Chiang Mai in recent years.

History

Lampang was a major city in the Lanna kingdom.  However, its historical prominence is largely overshadowed by Chiang Mai or Chiang Rai which were the traditional seats of government, and whose histories were well recorded in chronicles. Following decades of warfare with both the Ava Burmese and Ayudhya during the 17th-18th century, the region was in decline, severely depopulated, and subject to Burmese control.

In the late 18th century, the famed marksman and Lampang native Nan Thipchang assassinated the local Burmese leader in Wat Phra That Lampang Luang, and led an uprising which led to a rollback of Burmese rule over Lanna. Allied with Bangkok, the descendants of Nan Thipchang, known as Chao Ched Ton (the seven princes), became the vassal rulers of the various Lanna cities until the annexation of Lanna into Siam (Thailand) proper under King Chulalongkorn (Rama V).

Economy

Besides the traditional rice paddy farming, pineapple, and sugarcane constitute major food crops in Lampang Province. The province has a large deposit of lignite in Mae Moh district, fuelling several coal-fired electricity generating plants, whose pollution has severely affected the local populations. Lampang also has a large deposit of kaolin which is widely utilized in the ceramics industry. Historically, logging was an important industry, since Lampang, together with nearby Phrae had a large stand of teak. Many elephants were employed to transport the logs to the river for transport to Bangkok, hence the founding of an "elephant school", the predecessor of the Thai Elephant Conservation Center. Much of the old growth teak stands in Lampang had been thoroughly harvested.

Culture
Lampang, also called "mueang rot ma" in Thai, meaning "horse carriage city", is considered by some Thais as the last paradise in Thailand. Although well-connected by rail, and four lane highways to both Bangkok and Chiang Mai, it is here that tourists can still find horse-drawn carriages in regular use for transportation. One account attributes the horse-drawn carriage to the Portuguese, via Macau, although a more likely origin is colonial Burma. Lampang was an important center of the timber industry in the early-20th century and saw an influx of migrants from British-controlled Burma. The horse-drawn carriage is one of the most memorable symbols of Lampang, as reflected in many traditional products.

Lampang has a few institutions of higher learning, such as Yonok College, and a branch of Thammasat University.

Health 
The main hospital of Lampang is Lampang Hospital, operated by the Ministry of Public Health.

Transportation
The city is an important highway hub, with a four lane highway link to Chiang Mai and Chiang Rai, as well as a major highway to Phrae and the eastern Lanna provinces. Lampang is roughly a 1.5 hour bus ride to Chiang Mai. Nakhon Lampang railway station is a stop for the Chiang Mai-bound train, approximately 10 hours from Bangkok.

Lampang Airport is served by Bangkok Airways (three flights daily to Suvarnabhumi Airport) and Nok air (four flights daily to Don Mueang) (Oct 2015).

Landmarks and tourist attractions

Tourists typically stop by for lunch and visit the more famous attractions such as Wat Phra That Lampang Luang and the Thai Elephant Conservation Center and then proceed to points further north such as Chiang Mai or Chiang Rai. Less well-known tourist attractions in Lampang are thus mostly visited by locals. Among these are the Wang Kaeo Waterfall and the Chae Son National Park, a compact park which combines a natural hot spring with large waterfalls.

Many temples in downtown Lampang were built in the Burmese -style, originally endowed by the logging tycoons of the late-19th century. Wat Si Bun Rueang, Wat Si Chum and Wat Pa Fang are among the extant examples. Nine of the 31 remaining Burmese-style temples in Thailand are in Lampang. Traditional Lanna architecture can be found at Wat Phra That Lampang Luang, on the site of ancient Lampang city. It is famous for its murals from the 19th century. The city seal features a white rooster in the temple's gate.

Wat Phra Kaeo Don Tao, on the west bank of the Wang River, is said to have housed the Emerald Buddha between 1436 and 1468. Wat Phra That Chedi Sao (The Temple of Twenty Chedis) is famous for its array of twenty pagodas. Other temples of some renown include Wat Phra That Chom Ping and Wat Lai Hin both in the Ko Kha District.

Mae Mo mine is a vast open pit lignite mine in the Mae Mo basin. The mine and the adjoining power generation facilities are operated by EGAT. The power plant is a major source of electric power for Thailand.

Lampang is known for its horse-drawn carriages, which were introduced in 1916 and remain popular with tourists.

Education
Lampang has a number of educational institutions, including kindergartens, primary, secondary and vocational schools. Schools teach in the English, Thai, and Chinese languages. Lampang also has a number of universities: Lampang Rajabhat University, Rajmangala University of Technology, Nation University (formerly Yonok) and a satellite campus of Thammasat University. Lampang College of Commerce and Technology (LCCT) and Lampang International Technical College (LIT) are well known schools which teach technology.

References

External links

Cities and towns in Thailand
Populated places in Lampang province